The Bastogne War Museum is a World War II museum focusing on the Battle of the Bulge. It is located a few kilometers northeast of the Bastogne city center in the Belgian province of Luxembourg.

The museum is located on the former Bastogne Historical Centre site and was opened on March 21, 2014 after four years of work. It features a highly interactive audio tour walkthrough which lasts at least two hours. It also showcases many artifacts from the events leading up to and the battle of Bastogne itself, three immersive shows and the story of four fictional characters involved in the battle. The main exhibition progresses chronologically and presents a timeline before, during and after the offensive. There are also a museum shop and a café.

Sights

Mardasson Memorial

Next to the museum lies the Mardasson Memorial sited on the same grounds. The large monument is a tribute to the 76,890 American casualties or missing soldiers from the Battle of the Bulge. Numerous texts are engraved on it as well as all US states and the involved US divisions. Visitors can walk atop the 12-meter high monument via spiral stairs.

"Thunderbolt" Sherman tank
Belonging to the 11th US Armored Division, the tank was completely renovated and sited near the end of the walkthrough. On 30 December 1944, three days after the siege of Bastogne, a German attack brought the vehicle to a stop. Its crew were taken as Prisoners of war and taken to a war camp.

Characters in walkthrough
The museum's exhibition centers around the converging stories of four fictional characters who played their role in the battle.
 Robert Keane, an American corporal in the US 101st Airborne Division who joined the US army after his brother was already fighting in the Pacific theater against the Japanese.
 Hans Wegmüller, a German lieutenant from the German 26th Volksgrenadier Division. Prior to his role in the Ardennes offensive, Wegmüller also fought on the Eastern front against the Soviets.
 Mathilde Devillers, a Belgian young lady working as teacher in a school in Bastogne. She lives in a farm close to the town with family.
 Émile Mostade, a 13-year old Belgian schoolboy. His parents run a bicycle shop in Bastogne and he owns an accordion.
Visitors are introduced to their stories and how they experience the war and its build-up. Eventually all four meet when hiding in a cellar during the Luftwaffe's aerial bombardments of Bastogne (which was then an enclave in the German advance).

References

Battle of the Bulge
Museums in Luxembourg (Belgium)
Bastogne